The Godement resolution of a sheaf is a construction in homological algebra that allows one to view global, cohomological information about the sheaf in terms of local information coming from its stalks.  It is useful for computing sheaf cohomology.  It was discovered by Roger Godement.

Godement construction 
Given a topological space X (more generally, a topos X with enough points), and a sheaf F on X, the Godement construction for F gives a sheaf  constructed as follows.  For each point , let  denote the stalk of F at x.  Given an open set , define

An open subset  clearly induces a restriction map , so  is a presheaf. One checks the sheaf axiom easily. One also proves easily that  is flabby, meaning each restriction map is surjective. The map  can be turned into a functor because a map between two sheaves induces maps between their stalks. Finally, there is a canonical map of sheaves  that sends each section to the 'product' of its germs.

Another way to view  is as follows. Let  be the set X with the discrete topology. Let  be the continuous map induced by the identity. Then , and the unit of this adjunction is the natural transformation described above.

Because of this adjunction, there is an associated monad on the category of sheaves on X.  Using this monad there is a way to turn a sheaf F into a coaugmented cosimplicial sheaf.  This coaugmented cosimplicial sheaf gives rise to an augmented cochain complex that is defined to be the Godement resolution of F.

In more down-to-earth terms, let , and let  denote the canonical map.  For each , let  denote , and let  denote the canonical map.  The resulting resolution is a flabby resolution of F, and its cohomology is the sheaf cohomology of F.

References 
 
 

Sheaf theory
Algebraic topology
Homological algebra